Courtnall is a surname. Notable people with the surname include:

Courtnall Skosan (born 1991), South African rugby player
Geoff Courtnall (born 1962), Canadian ice hockey player
Russ Courtnall (born 1965), Canadian ice hockey player